Ronny Wayne "Ron" Davies (January 15, 1946 – October 30, 2003) was an American songwriter and musician. He was described by CMT News at the time of his death as "the family's artistic trailblazer" although "less celebrated… than his [younger] sister, singer/songwriter and producer Gail Davies."

The son of country singer Tex Dickerson, Ron took the name Davies after he and his siblings were adopted by their stepfather, Darby Davies. He began his professional songwriting career at the age of 17, when he wrote an entire album of songs (Outburst!) for the Tacoma, Washington-based Wailers. He released two albums of his own on A&M Records, Silent Song Through the Land and U. F. O, which he co-produced with Grammy Award-winning engineer Tommy Vicari.

Davies's 1970 song "It Ain't Easy" was covered by Three Dog Night (on their album of the same name), Long John Baldry (as title song of his 1971 album), David Bowie (on his 1972 Ziggy Stardust album), Dave Edmunds, and Grammy Award winner Shelby Lynne, among others; his "Long, Hard Climb" by Helen Reddy and Maria Muldaur; “Silent Song Through the Land” by the Association; "The Man I Used to Be" by Jerry Jeff Walker; and "Waitin' on a Dark-Eyed Girl" by the Nitty Gritty Dirt Band. Davies moved to Nashville, Tennessee in 1985 where he wrote for Cedarwood Publishing and later for Warner/Chappell Music. Although not a professional actor, he played the lead role in the George Jones video Cold Hard Truth in 1999.

Davies died of a heart attack at his home in Nashville on October 30, 2003. In 2013 an album of his songs entitled Unsung Hero: A Tribute to the Music of Ron Davies was released, featuring 22 well-known artists including John Prine, Dolly Parton, Vince Gill, Alison Krauss, Delbert McClinton, Crystal Gayle and jazz legend Benny Golson.

Discography

Notes

External links

 
 rondaviesunsunghero.com
 

1946 births
2003 deaths
American male singer-songwriters
American singer-songwriters
20th-century American singers
20th-century American male singers